Chifure AS Elfen Saitama (ちふれASエルフェン埼玉) is a Japanese women's football club from Saitama. Founded in 1991, they have played in the WE League since 2021.

Kits

Kit suppliers and shirt sponsors

Staff

Manager: Tomoe Tanabe
Assistant manager: Teppei Noguchi
Goalkeeping coach: Nozomi Yamago
Physical coach and trainer: Mitsui Hisatsugu 
Technical Staff: Yuhei Itagaki
Trainer: Yuka Ito
Competent: Misato Nunoyama

Players

Current squad

Type 2

Season-by-season records

Transition of team name
AS Elfen FC: 1991–2001
AS Elfen Sayama FC: 2002–2013
AS Elfen Saitama: 2014–2015
Chifure AS Elfen Saitama: 2016–present

See also
Japan Football Association (JFA)
List of women's football clubs in Japan
2022–23 in Japanese football

References

External links
 

Women's football clubs in Japan
Association football clubs established in 1991
1991 establishments in Japan
Sports teams in Saitama Prefecture
WE League clubs